Haz Jana Sahid Baba Dergah is a popular religious place in Mundwa, Nagaur district, Rajasthan, India. The dargah is the tomb of the Sufi saint Jana Sahid. Dargah is situated 2 km outside Mundwa at Kharda road and Marwar Mundwa (मारवाड़ मूण्डवा) or Mundwa (मूण्डवा) village is situated at Nagaur-Ajmer highway 20 km away from Nagaur district headquarters.

Dargahs in India
Nagaur district